Leporinus enyae is a species of Leporinus fish discovered 2017 in the Orinoco River drainage area. It is named after the Irish singer Enya, whose major music hit "Orinoco Flow" deals with the Orinoco River, among others.

References

Taxa named by Michael D. Burns
Taxa named by Marcus Chatfield
Taxa named by José Luis Olivan Birindelli
Taxa named by Brian L. Sidlauskas
Taxa described in 2017
Anostomidae